Auditorio Municipal is an indoor arena in Torreón, Mexico.  It is primarily used for basketball and is the home field of the Toros Laguna and Algodoneras.  It holds 4,363 people.

Municipal
Sports venues in Coahuila
Indoor arenas in Mexico
Basketball venues in Mexico
Volleyball venues in Mexico